The 2011 ICO Crossminton World Championships, with the full name 1. ISBO Azimut Hotels Speedminton® World Championships, was a crossminton tournament, taking place in Berlin, Germany, a between 24 and 25 August 2011. It was the 1st ever Crossminton World Championships to be played and 370 players from 29 countries participated at the event that took place at a time when crossminton was still named speed badminton.

Venue 
The tournament, organised by Speedminton GmbH, was played on outdoor tennis clay court of the Steffi-Graf-Stadion in Berlin.

Medal summary

Medalists

Junior Tournament Medalists

Senior Tournament Medalists

Participating nations

References

External links 
German Press
German Press
German Press
Slovenian Press
Polish Press

Badminton tournaments in Germany
Sports competitions in Berlin
2011 in German sport